Mass media in Chad is controlled by the government.

Radio

List of radio stations
 Radio ADMC, in Abéché, FM 95.006
 Radio Arc-en-Ciel, in N'Djamena (est. 2005), FM 87.6; Catholic
 Radio Brakoss (est. 2000), in Moïssala, FM 98.105
 Dja FM, in N'Djamena (est. 1999), FM 96.91
 Radio Duji Lokar (est. 2001)and Radio Étoile de Matin, in Moundou (est. 2000), FM 101.83; Catholic
 Radio Effata, in Laï (est. 2005), FM 98.0; Catholic
 Radio FM Liberté, in N'Djamena (est. 2000) FM 105.31
 Radio Lotiko, in Sarh (est. 2001), FM 97.65; Catholic
 Radiodiffusion nationale tchadienne – RNT, in N'Djamena (est. 1955), FM 94.051
 Radio Oxygène, in N'Djamena (est. 2017), FM 96.3
 Radio Terre Nouvelle, in Bongor (est. 2000), FM 99.44; Catholic
 La Voix du Paysan, in Doba (est. 1996), FM 96.22; Catholic
 RF 1 Afrique

Television
Over the years in Chad more and more privately owned television stations have been created. Before 2014 the one and only television station ONRTV (Tele Tchad), now called ONAMA, was state owned. In 2014 the first privately owned station was Electron TV, company which sparked the boom of other privately owned stations to form.

All stations broadcast some programs in French and some in Arabic except for Al Nassour TV and Al Nassour 24 TV, which only broadcast in Arabic. Lale TV is a station that broadcasts drama and cultural shows in French and Arabic, Elecron TV (with 3 news sessions) is more based on the promotion of young people and music, Tchad 24 is the newest station in Chad broadcasting a variety of programs including news, and, finally, the state-owned Télé Tchad broadcasts from the ONAMA news tower in N'Djamena. ONAMA owns provincial stations in many cities around Chad including Mondo, Doba, Borkou, Mongo, and many more. As television keeps getting more popular in the country, many more privately owned television stations arise.

List of television stations
GOVERNMENT-OWNED
 ONAMA (TELE TCHAD)
 ONAMA PROVINCIAL STATIONS

PRIVATELY-OWNED
 ELECTRON TV
 AL NASSOUR TV
 AL NASSOUR 24 TV
 TCHAD 24 TV
 LALE TC TCHAD
VIEWABLE IN CHAD
 AFRIQUE MEDIA

List of newspapers
 Abba Garde [1]
 Alwihda [fr]
 Cloche, monthly
 Da'kouna, monthly
 Info-Tchad, weekly[2]
 La Marche
 Le Messager du Moyen-Chari
 Le Miroir, bi-monthly
 N’Djamena al-Djadida [1]
 N'Djamena Bi-Hebdo [fr], bi-weekly[1]
 N'Djamena Hebdo, est. 1989; weekly[3]
 Notre Temps, est. 2000; weekly[3]
 L'Observateur, est. 1997; weekly[3]
 Le Progrès, est. 1993; daily, government-subsidized[3][1]
 RAFIGUI Presse Jeunes
 Sarh Tribune
 Sud Echos, weekly
 Tchad et Culture, est. 1961; monthly[2]
 Le Temps, est. 1995; weekly[3]

Freedom of Speech
It is tough being a journalist in Chad. Reporters are often arrested for their writings. Most are usually released fairly quickly, but some have been held arbitrarily for weeks or even months, and more have been mistreated while detained. In 2019, a newspaper editor initially charged with defaming a former government minister was sentenced to three years in prison for “association for the purpose of computer crime”, a charge that was fabricated by the prosecution with the sole aim of keeping him in prison; where he has been physically attacked and is being held in appalling conditions.

Coverage of impunity or criticism of President Idriss Deby Itno and those close to him is not tolerated and can lead to expulsion (for foreign journalists), to abduction and arbitrary detention (for Chadian journalists) and to the closure of media outlets – the fate suffered by a weekly newspaper in 2018. 
Journalists are exposed to the threat of terrorism, as was seen in 2019 when a national TV cameraman travelling with an army convoy was killed by a mine in the road. Journalists have also been subjected to violence by the security forces while covering street protests against the government’s austerity measures. In response to calls from journalists’ associations, the Chadian media staged a “Day without Press” in February 2018, in which media outlets stopped broadcasting and publishing for an entire day to denounce the attacks on journalists and media by the political police and regular police, which enjoy complete impunity. A month later, the authorities blocked access to social media and did not restore it until July 2019, after a total of 470 days. This established Chad as one of Africa’s worst cyber-censors in recent years.

List of telecommunication companies 

Sotel Tchad.
TchadNet.
Bharti Airtel (Airtel Chad)
Millicom (Tigo Chad)
Tchad Mobile (Orascom)
Sitcom.
Salam Mobile.
Maroc Telecom.
Tigo
Airtel

References
 
 Infoasaid Chad Media & Telecoms Landscape Guide - http://www.infoasaid.org/sites/infoasaid.org/files/chad_media_guide_-_final_for_publication_041012.pdf
 www.infoasaid.org

Bibliography
  (Includes broadcasting)

External links
 

 
Chad
Chad